Thryptomene orbiculata is a species of flowering plant in the family Myrtaceae and is endemic to the west of Western Australia. It is a shrub with broadly egg-shaped to more or less round leaves, and flowers with five pinkish petals and usually ten stamens.

Description
Flowering occurs from July to October.

Taxonomy
Thryptomene orbiculata was first formally described in 2014 by Barbara Lynette Rye and Malcolm Eric Trudgen in the journal Nuytsia from specimens Trudgen collected north-east of Geraldton in 2003. The specific epithet (orbiculata) means "circular", referring to the shape of the leaves.

Distribution and habitat
This thryptomene usually grows in sandy soil from near East Yuna to near Mingenew in the Avon Wheatbelt and Geraldton Sandplains biogeographic regions of Western Australia.

Conservation status
Thryptomene orbiculata is classified as "Priority Three" by the Government of Western Australia Department of Parks and Wildlife meaning that it is poorly known and known from only a few locations but is not under imminent threat.

References

orbiculata
Endemic flora of Western Australia
Rosids of Western Australia
Vulnerable flora of Australia
Plants described in 2014
Taxa named by Barbara Lynette Rye
Taxa named by Malcolm Eric Trudgen